Chen Xiaofeng, born Chen Wuyong, pseudonyms Nanshan Daoren, Xianhua Shanren, is a Chinese painter, calligrapher and scholar of the new Zhe School.

Life
Chen was born in Pujiang, Zhejiang. In his early childhood, Chen studied Ren Bonian, Wu Changshuo, Zhang Shuqi, Wu Fuzhi, Zheng Zuwei and other paintings from local squire in Pujiang. In his youth, he went to Hangzhou and studied with Professor Wu Shanming, and then studied at Nankai University. In 1988, he founded the Youth Art Society, and from 1989 to 1990, he was the president of the Hushu Society in Hangzhou; in 1995, he was one of the founders of Dazhen National Institute that media described as "Three Masters of Qiantang". Chen was elected the President of Wulin Academy of Arts in 2002 and taught as the visiting professor of Nanchang Institute of Technology.

Artworks
Many of Chen's artworks were figure paintings and paintings of landscape that incorporate the characteristics of both the Southern and Northern schools.

References

Sources

The Paintings of Chen Xiaofeng, Culture and Art Publishing House

External links

Painters from Zhejiang
People from Jinhua
Living people
Year of birth missing (living people)